Harm van den Dorpel (born 1981) is a Berlin-based conceptual artist. His work has been exhibited internationally in Germany, the United States, Italy, United Kingdom and the Netherlands. His broad practice includes the creation of sculpture, collage, computer animation, computer generated graphics and interaction design. In 2015 he co-founded Left Gallery based in Berlin. He is regarded a key figure in Post-Internet art.

Work 
In his work he investigates how algorithms can analyse digital archives and guide the artist in aesthetic decision taking, leading to a symbiosis of man-machine art creation. Using computer programming he describes traditional notions in art, such as for example the free use of intuition and expression. Conclusions from this research are then fed back in the production of new work. His ultimate goal is to reveal the reasoning structure of his own consciousness, and his implicit associations and assumptions. In this process he borrows ideas from psychoanalysis, the writing of Jacques Derrida, and Artificial Intelligence (which he studied).

He's had institutional exhibitions at Museum Kurhaus Kleve, the New Museum in New York, The Ullens Center for Contemporary Art in Beijing, China, the Museum of Modern Art, Warsaw, and the Netherlands Media Art Institute, Amsterdam.

In 2015 MAK - Museum of Applied Arts (Vienna) acquired Harm van den Dorpel's screensaver Event Listeners and thereby became the first museum to purchase a work of art using bitcoins.

Between 2006 - 2010 he has been a creative programming teacher and interaction design teacher at private training centres and at the Gerrit Rietveld Art Academie in Amsterdam. Harm van den Dorpel is co-founder of Left Gallery a gallery that produces and sells downloadable objects. Ownership of these objects is stored in a blockchain. The gallery opened in 2015.

Solo exhibitions

2016 
Death Imitates Language at Neumeister Bar-Am, Berlin

2015 
IOU at Narrative Projects, London 
Just In Time at American Medium, New York 
Ambiguity points to the mystery of all revealing at Neumeister Bar-Am, Berlin 
Loomer at Young Projects, Los Angeles

2014 
Emergent Conclusions – room.thecomposingrooms.com

2013 
Release Early, Release Often, Delegate Everything You Can, be Open to the Point of Promiscuity at Abrons Art Center, New York

2012 
About at Wilkinson Gallery, London  
The Mews Project Space, London

References

External links 
Artist page on Neumeister Bar-Am

1981 births
Living people
Dutch conceptual artists
People from Zaanstad